The 1978–79 Idaho Vandals men's basketball team represented the University of Idaho during the 1978–79 NCAA Division I men's basketball season. Members of the Big Sky Conference, the Vandals were led by first-year head coach Don Monson and played their home games on campus at the Kibbie Dome in Moscow, Idaho. They were 11–15 overall and 4–10 in conference play.

After four seasons with last place finishes in the conference, Jim Jarvis resigned as head coach in June 1978 under recurring allegations of illegal recruiting. The program had been placed on probation for one year in January, resulting in a reprimand for Jarvis and his assistant coach by the university.

He was succeeded in August by alumnus Monson, an assistant at Michigan State, who had significantly greater success. Although the Vandals were again in the cellar in 1979, the four conference wins were the most for the program in four years and the eleven wins the most in five. The groundwork had been made for significant improvement; Monson led Idaho to consecutive conference titles (1981, 1982) and the NCAA Sweet Sixteen in 1982.

Idaho's best-attended home games this season were the final two; 4,500 saw a fifteen-point loss to Boise State, while 4,600 enjoyed a 21-point upset of Idaho State in the finale.
It was the Vandals' first win over the Bengals in four years; ISU had won the previous seven meetings. A month earlier, the Vandals won decisively at Boise to snap two losing streaks; six to the Broncos and fifteen in  conference play.

The long-awaited win over Idaho State allowed the Vandals to regain possession of the "King Spud Trophy," an oversized metallic potato with a face and a crown, first played for in 1962. Bengal head coach Lynn Archibald thought it should go to the losing team: "It's the ugliest thing I've ever seen. The only good thing that happened last week was losing it."

No Vandals were named to the all-conference team; junior guard Don Newman was on the second team, and junior forward Reed Jaussi was honorable mention.

Roster

References

External links
Sports Reference – Idaho Vandals: 1978–79 basketball season
Gem of the Mountains: 1979 University of Idaho yearbook – 1978–79 basketball season
Idaho Argonaut – student newspaper – 1979 editions

Idaho Vandals men's basketball seasons
Idaho
Idaho
Idaho